The Siona people (also known as Sioni, Pioje, or Pioche-Sioni) are an indigenous ethnic group living in the Ecuadorian Amazon or Oriente (est. population 250 in Ecuador (2000 Juncosa)), and in Putumayo Department in Colombia (est. population 300 in Colombia (1982 SIL)). They share territory along the Shushufindi, Aguarico, and Cuyabeno river with the Secoya people, with whom they are sometimes considered a single population.

The Siona language is a Tucanoan language.

The Siona people are organized politically through the National Organization of Seona Indigenous People of Ecuador (ONISE), whose president as of July 1996 was William Criollo.

According to Richard Evan Schultes, Where The Gods Reign, p. 27, the "Siona are one of the western Tukanoan groups and live in the Comissaria del Putamayo in the region of Mocoa."  I lived in this area in the summer of 1961 with members of the Summer Institute of Linguistics.  Our home was on the Ecuador side of the Putamayo River and the Siona lived on both sides of the river.

The Siona live in Sucumbios Province in Ecuador, mainly in the Cuyabeno Wildlife Reserve and in the Department of Putumayo along the Putumayo River. Besides some traditional activities for subsistence, they have been participating in the tourism activities since the 1990s. Nevertheless, their participation in the tourism sector has generated various sociocultural and economic changes such as immigration to neighboring cities, gender issues, economic dependency on tourism revenues. The religion of the Siona people is a type of shamanism that has many spirits that live inside of things like trees, bugs, plants, etc., . Their origin story is about a being named Baina, who did mythic deeds that made up the world as it is today. The Siona people hold many rituals and ceremonies but, the main ceremony is a healing ritual called Yahé

References

External links
Siona dictionary online (select simple or advanced browsing)
Ethnologue report for Siona

Indigenous peoples of the Amazon
Indigenous peoples in Colombia
Indigenous peoples in Ecuador
Ethnic groups in Ecuador
Indigenous languages of the South American Northern Foothills